The 2008 WTA Tour Championships (also known as the Sony Ericsson WTA Tour Championships for sponsorship reasons) was a tennis tournament played on outdoor hard courts. It was the 38th edition of the year-end singles championships, the 33rd edition of the year-end doubles championships, and is part of the 2008 WTA Tour. It took place at the Khalifa International Tennis Complex in Doha, Qatar, from 4 November through 9 November 2008.

Finals

Singles

 Venus Williams defeated  Vera Zvonareva, 6–7(5–7), 6–0, 6–2.
It was Venus Williams' 3rd title of the year, and her 39th overall. It was her 1st career year-end championships title.

Doubles

 Cara Black /  Liezel Huber defeated  Květa Peschke /  Rennae Stubbs, 6–1, 7–5.

Players
The top eight players and the top four doubles teams in the 2008 WTA Tour will qualify for the Championships. Two more players will also come to Doha as reserves. Should any player withdraw, they will enter the tournament.

Qualified singles players
On 30 July, Jelena Janković and Ana Ivanovic became the first two players to qualify for the year-end championships.

Following a surging 2007, Janković started the year at the Hopman Cup where she partnered with Novak Djokovic to reach the final, losing out to United States' Serena Williams and Mardy Fish. She reached the semifinals of the Australian Open a few weeks after falling to Maria Sharapova, the eventual champion  where she beat Serena Williams en route in the quarterfinals. In February and March, she reached a lone final at the Sony Ericsson Open losing to Serena Williams 1–6, 7–5, 3–6. She further reached two semifinals and two quarterfinals. In the clay season, Janković won the Italian Open for the second straight year against surprise finalist Alizé Cornet who was an 18-year-old qualifier. At the French Open, she reached her third straight major semifinal but fell in three grueling sets to once again the eventual champion in Ana Ivanovic, a match that decided the new World No. 1.

Janković then headed straight to Wimbledon where she lost to Tamarine Tanasugarn in the fourth round. Janković eventually became the 18th female No. 1, replacing compatriot Ivanovic on August 11. At the Beijing Olympics, she lost to eventual silver medalist Dinara Safina in the quarterfinals. At the US Open, Janković beat Elena Dementieva in the final four to reach her first Grand Slam final but lost to Serena Williams. In the fall season, she won three consecutive tournaments at the China Open, the Porsche Tennis Grand Prix and the Kremlin Cup justifying her return to the top spot.

Ana Ivanovic began the 2008 season by reaching the semifinals of the Australian Open where she lost to Maria Sharapova in straight sets. She then managed to win her sixth title and third Tier I title in Indian Wells, beating Jelena Janković and Svetlana Kuznetsova in the semifinals and finals respectively. Following a mediocre pre-French Open season where she failed to defend her title in Berlin, she entered Roland Garros as the second seed and favourite. She lived up to that expectation by winning her first Grand Slam (and her only to date) and becoming the first Serbian to reach the No. 1 spot, virtue of beating compatriot Janković in the semifinals. She defeated first-time Grand Slam finalist Dinara Safina 6–4, 6–3. In her first tournament as the new world No. 1 at Wimbledon, she was upset in the third round by Chinese wildcard Zheng Jie. Following a disappointing Wimbledon campaign, she suffered an injury-marred US Open Series as she withdrew from Los Angeles and the Olympics, which Ivanovic described as "one of the worst moments in my career". She played only one tournament which was at the Rogers Cup and was eliminated in the third round. As the top seed for the US Open, she suffered for the second straight major a loss to a player ranked outside the top 100 in French qualifier Julie Coin. She returned to form in October by winning the indoor tournament in Linz as well as reach the semifinals at the Kremlin Cup.

On 4 September, Serena Williams and Dinara Safina were announced as the third and fourth qualifiers for the Championships.     

Serena Williams started the year at the Hopman Cup where she teamed up with Mardy Fish to win it for the US. At the Australian Open, she made the quarterfinals losing to Jelena Janković.

On 18 September, Elena Dementieva became the fifth qualifier for the Championships. 

On 17 October, by reaching the quarterfinals at the Kremlin Cup, Svetlana Kuznetsova was confirmed as the sixth qualifier. 

On 25 October, the final two spots were taken by Vera Zvonareva and Venus Williams.

  Jelena Janković (4786)
  Dinara Safina (3823)
  Serena Williams (3681)
  Elena Dementieva (3400)
  Ana Ivanovic (3353)
  Vera Zvonareva (2626)
  Svetlana Kuznetsova (2627)
  Venus Williams (2524)

Singles alternates
  Agnieszka Radwańska (2256)
  Nadia Petrova (1914)

Withdrawn players
  Maria Sharapova (2515) (Sharapova announced a hiatus from tennis from the Rogers Cup until 2009, which prevented her from continuing to collect points and qualify)

Qualified doubles teams

In doubles, team Cara Black and Liezel Huber qualified with convincing lead with more than 6,000 points, while other three teams all failed to collect even a half of that number of points, with all of them being around 2,000.

  Cara Black /  Liezel Huber (6158)
  Anabel Medina Garrigues /  Virginia Ruano Pascual (2809)
  Květa Peschke /  Rennae Stubbs (2614)
  Ai Sugiyama /  Katarina Srebotnik (2542)

Singles Championship Race

Singles
Players in gold have qualified for Doha. Players in brown withdrawn. The low-ranked players in blue after them would be played as alternates in Doha.

References

External links

 

WTA Tour Championships
2008
Tennis tournaments in Qatar
WTA Tour Championships
Sports competitions in Doha